Saphenista muerta is a species of moth of the family Tortricidae. It is found in Costa Rica.

The length of the forewings is about 7 mm. All fasciae on the forewings are golden yellow, intermixed with brownish-yellow scales. The costal margin is brown and the costal strigulae (fine streaks) silver. The hindwings are pale grey, but slightly darker along the anterior margin.

The larvae feed on Monnina species. They induce galls, which are about 11 mm wide and about 20 mm long. They bore the central part of the pith of the stem. Pupation takes place in the gall chamber within a loose cocoon.

Etymology
The species name refers to Cerro de la Muerte, the type locality.

References

Moths described in 2004
Saphenista